The Polovtsian Dances, or Polovetsian Dances ( from the Russian "Polovtsy"—the name given to the Kipchaks and Cumans by the Rus' people) form an exotic scene at the end of act 2 of Alexander Borodin's opera Prince Igor.

The work remained unfinished when the composer died in 1887, although he had worked on it for more than a decade. A performing version was prepared by Nikolai Rimsky-Korsakov and Alexander Glazunov in 1890. Several other versions, or "completions", of the opera have been made. The dances are performed with chorus and last between 11 and 14 minutes. They occur in act 1 or act 2, depending on which version of the opera is being used. Their music is popular and often given in concert as an orchestral showpiece. At such performances the choral parts are often omitted. The opera also has a "Polovtsian March" which opens act 3, and an overture at the start. When the dances are given in concert, a suite may be formed: Overture – Polovtsian Dances and March from Prince Igor.

Analysis

The first dance, which uses no chorus and is sometimes omitted in concerts, is No. 8, entitled "Dance of the Polovtsian Maidens" ["Пляска половецких девушек"]: presto, 6/8, F major; it is placed directly after the "Chorus of the Polovtsian Maidens" which opens the act and is followed by "Konchakovna's Cavatina".

Theme from No. 8

The dances proper appear at the end of the act as an uninterrupted single number in several contrasting sections, as in the following list. Basic themes are identified by letters in brackets (e.g. [a]) and illustrated in the notation below the list.
No. 17, "Polovtsian Dance with Chorus" [Половецкая пляска с хором tr. Polovetskaya plyaska s khorom]
[a] Introduction: Andantino, 4/4, A major
[b] Gliding Dance of the Maidens [Пляска девушек плавная]: Andantino, 4/4, F minor
[c + a] Wild Dance of the Men [Пляска мужчин дикая]: Allegro vivo, 4/4, F major
[d] General Dance [Общая пляска]: Allegro, 3/4, D major
[e] Dance of the Boys [Пляска мальчиков] and 2nd Dance of the Men [Пляска мужчин]: Presto, 6/8, D minor
[b′ + e′] Gliding Dance of the Maidens (reprise, soon combined with the faster dancing of the boys): Moderato alla breve, 2/2, A major
[e″] Dance of the Boys and 2nd Dance of the Men (reprise): Presto, 6/8, D minor
[c′ + a″] General Dance: Allegro con spirito, 4/4, A major

Themes from No. 17

Notable instrumental solos include those for clarinet (in No. 8 and the Men's Dance [c]) and the oboe and English horn (in the Women's Dance [b]).

Translation

The text of the first stanza of this particular section in the opera is given below.
Невольницы:
Улетай на крыльях ветра
Ты в край родной, родная песня наша,
Туда, где мы тебя свободно пели,
Где было так привольно нам с тобою.
Там, под знойным небом,
Негой воздух полон,
Там под говор моря
Дремлют горы в облаках;
Там так ярко солнце светит,
Родные горы светом заливая,
В долинах пышно розы расцветают,
И соловьи поют в лесах зеленых,
И сладкий виноград растет.
Там тебе привольней, песня,
Ты туда и улетай.
 
Половцы:
Пойте песни славы хану! Пой!
Славьте силу, дочесть хана! Славь!
Славен хан! Хан!
Славен он, хан наш!
Блеском славы
Солнцу равен хан!
Нету равных славой хану! Нет!
Чаги хана славят хана.
Хана своего.
Nevolnitsy:
Uletay na krylyakh vetra
Ty v kraj rodnoy, rodnaya pesnya nasha,
Tuda, gde my tebya svobodno peli,
Gde bylo tak privolno nam s tobyu.
Tam, pod znoynym nebom,
Negoy vozdukh polon,
Tam pod govor morya
Dremlut gory v oblakakh;
Tam tak yarko solntse svetit,
Rodnyye gory svetom zalivaya,
V dolinakh pyshno rozy rastsvetayut,
I solovyi poyut v lesakh zelyonykh,
I sladkiy vinograd rastyot.
Tam tebe privolney, pesnya,
Ty tuda i uletay.
 
Polovtsy
Poyte pesni slavy khanu! Poy!
Slav'te silu, dochest' khana! Slav'!
Slaven khan! Khan!
Slaven on, khan nash!
Bleskom slavy
Solntsu raven khan!
Nyetu ravnykh slavoy khanu! Nyet!
Chagi khana slavyat khana.
Khana svoyego.
Slavewomen:
Fly on the wings of the wind
To our native land, dear song of ours,
There, where we have sung you at liberty,
Where we felt so free in singing you.
There, under the hot sky,
The air is full of bliss,
There to the sound of the sea
The mountains doze in the clouds;
There the sun shines so brightly,
Bathing the native mountains in light,
Splendid roses blossom in the valleys,
And nightingales sing in the green forests.
And sweet grapes grow.
You are free there, song,
Fly home,
 
Polovtsians
Sing songs of praise to the Khan! Sing!
Praise the power and valor of the Khan!
Praise the glorious Khan!
He is glorious, our Khan!
In the brilliance of his glory,
The Khan is equal to the sun!
There is none equal to the Khan in glory, none!
The Khan female slaves praise the Khan,
Their Khan!

The English translation of the remaining is:
:Konchak [the Khan]
Do you see the captives
From the distant sea;
Do you see my beauties,
From beyond the Caspian Sea?
Oh, tell me, friend,
Tell me just one word:
If you want to,
I will give you anyone of them.

Polovtsians
Sing songs of praise to the Khan! Sing!
Praised be his generosity, praised be his mercy!
Praise him!
To his enemies the Khan is merciless
He, our Khan!
Who may equal the Khan in glory, who?
In the brilliance of his glory,
He is equal to the sun!
Our Khan, Khan Konchak, is equal
In glory to his forefathers!
The terrible Khan Konchak is equal
In glory to his forefathers!
Glorious is our Khan Konchak!
Glory, glory!

All the Slaves
(Repeats the opening stanza)

Polovtsians
Our Khan, Khan Konchak, is equal
In glory to his forefathers!
The grim Khan Konchak is equal
In glory to his forefathers!
Glory, glory to Khan Konchak!
Khan Konchak!
With your dancing entertain the Khan,
Dance to entertain the Khan, slaves!
Your Khan!
Dance to entertain the Khan, slaves!
Your Khan!
With your dancing entertain the Khan!
Entertain with dancing!
Our Khan Konchak!

Ballets Russes performances
As part of his first  at the Théâtre du Châtelet in Paris, Sergei Diaghilev presented Polovtsian Scenes and Dances, consisting of act 2 of Prince Igor, with full orchestra and singers. The premiere took place on 18 May 1909. The choreography was by Michel Fokine and the sets and costumes were designed by Nicholas Roerich. In later seasons, without singers, the work was given as The Polovtsian Dances. For the 1923 season, it was partly re-choreographed by Bronislava Nijinska.

In 1971, the ballet was presented by choreographer Igor Moiseyev in the USSR Folk Dance Ensemble (Одноактный балет "Половецкие пляски". Балет Игоря Моисеева). It was premiered at the Palais des Sports at the Porte de Versailles in Paris; in Moscow, in the Tchaikovsky Concert Hall, in Leningrad and other cities of the USSR. The ballet was filmed.

In popular culture
Themes from the Polovtsian Dances have been used widely in popular culture. The 1953 musical Kismet is mostly adapted from Borodin's music, including these dances. The most prominent example is the popular standard "Stranger in Paradise," adapted from the "Gliding Dance of the Maidens."

References

Borodin, A. Le Prince Igor. Partition pour chant et piano. Edition M. P. Belaieff. (Russian, French, and German text.)

External links

 
, Dutch National Opera

Orchestral suites
Compositions by Alexander Borodin
1890 compositions
Ballets designed by Nicholas Roerich
Opera excerpts